Statistics of League of Ireland in the 1984–1985 season.

Overview
It was contested by 16 teams, and Shamrock Rovers won the championship. The prize for the League Champions was £5,000.

Final table

Bottom four clubs relegated to the new First Division for next season.

Bray Wanderers, Cobh Ramblers, Derry City, E.M.F.A., Monaghan United and Newcastle United were elected to the 1985–86 League of Ireland First Division.

Results

Top scorers

References

Ireland, 1984-85
1984–85 in Republic of Ireland association football
League of Ireland seasons